After Hours is 1989 studio album by the jazz pianist André Previn, accompanied by the double bassist Ray Brown and the guitarist Joe Pass.

Track listing

Personnel
André Previn – piano
Joe Pass – guitar
Ray Brown – double bass

Production
 Recording Engineer – Jack Renner
 Producer – Robert Woods

External links

References

1989 albums
André Previn albums
Instrumental albums
Telarc Records albums